São Tomé and Príncipe competed at the 2019 World Championships in Athletics in Doha, Qatar, from 27 September–6 October 2019.

Results
(q – qualified, NM – no mark, SB – season best)

Women 
Track and road events

References

Nations at the 2019 World Athletics Championships
São Tomé and Príncipe at the World Championships in Athletics
2019 in São Tomé and Príncipe